Taurupe Parish is an administrative unit of Ogre Municipality in the Vidzeme region of Latvia.

Towns, villages and settlements of Taurupe Parish

References 

Parishes of Latvia
Ogre Municipality
Vidzeme